Technocrat is a superhero in the DC Comics and a former member of the Outsiders. His first appearance was in Outsiders Alpha (vol. 2) #1 (November 1993), written by Mike W. Barr and drawn by Paul Pelletier.

Baron nicknamed "TC" was portrayed by Christopher Ammanuel starting in the third season  of the live action Arrowverse series Black Lightning.

Fictional character biography

Markovia
An inventor and business magnate, Geoffrey Barron came to Markovia to sell his battle armor, the Technocrat 2000, the latest in personal defense gear (in 1993). Barron was accompanied by his bodyguard Charlie Wylde.

During their stay in Markovia, the Outsiders were framed for the murder of Markovia's Queen Ilona. Barron and Wylde were forced to flee into the woods alongside the Outsiders. While in the woods the pair encountered the sorcerer Sebastian Faust and his pet bear. The bear mortally wounded Wylde, and in order to save Wylde's life, Faust fused both Wylde and the bear into a huge amalgam, a werebear. The Outsiders fight Prince Roderick and his vampire troops.

Geoffry Barron wound up having to put on the Technocrat 2000 suit in order to defend himself. Barron and the newly mutated Wylde joined the Outsiders in their attempt to clear their names. Barron offered the team his home in Switzerland as a safe haven. Unbeknownst to Barron, his ex-wife Marissa had paid the assassin known as Sanction to assassinate him. It turns out Sanction is known to Wylde and Barron as Ryer, an associate of the CIA. As Barron understands it, Ryer was punished by the CIA for blatantly advertising a drug-dealing side venture. Ryer himself believes that Barron abandoned him in Angola. Sanction's first defeat comes when Katana disrupts his systems with her sword. (Outsiders (vol. 2) #2 December 1993 

At one point, Technocrat assists in defending the alien planet Nekrome from the supernatural threat of Eclipso. This ends with his armor being upgraded with alien technology.

Gotham

The Outsiders barely made it back to Gotham City before clearing their names. Shortly after their homecoming, Sanction the assassin kills both Marissa Barron and Halo. The trauma of this death forced the Aurakle inside of Halo to jump into Marissa's body. After this, Barron found it difficult to separate his feelings for his wife from Halo's physical body. Barron began to fall in love with the Aurakle, but Halo had her own designs on their teammate, Faust.

When the Outsiders split into two teams for a time, Technocrat joined the team with Geo-Force and Katana so as to distance himself from Halo. At one point Prince Brion (Geo-Force) tried unsuccessfully to arrange a date between Barron and Katana. The two halves of the team eventually rejoined and Technocrat remained with them through the end of their recorded adventures. Technocrat loses Wylde to the plans of Felix Faust. Wylde, overcome by his feelings for Looker, ends up betraying the team to Felix Faust and becoming a near mindless bear trapped in a zoo. Before the modern era, Technocrat was last seen in attendance at Geo-Force's wedding.

Infinite Crisis
Technocrat is one of the many heroes to answer the call to defend Metropolis from an assembled army of supervillains intent on destroying it. Technocrat is seen hovering in a single panel behind Looker just before Breach explodes. He appeared in Outsiders (vol. 4) #38 alive and well battling Black Lightning and his team of Outsiders on behalf of Geo-Force.

Powers and abilities
Technocrat had no metahuman abilities, he was a genius level cyberneticist and polymath. He wore a high tech powered exoskeleton of his own design, which could be equipped with a variety of weapons and modular add-ons and upgrades.

In other media
Baron / Technocrat appears in Black Lightning, portrayed by Christopher Ammanuel. This version, also known as "T.C.", is a technopathic metahuman who was previously placed in one of the A.S.A.'s pods after being exposed to the drug "Green Light" years prior to the series. After being freed from his pod and learning how far technology has advanced, he takes up residence in an old radio station, where he meets and befriends Peter Gambi. After learning the latter provides technical assistance to Black Lightning and his family, T.C. assists them in various missions against the A.S.A., Markovian forces, and Tobias Whale throughout the series before Gambi passes on his duties to T.C.

References

External links
Cosmic Teams: Technocrat

https://pro.imdb.com/name/nm8162745?ref_=m_acc_yourpage

DC Comics superheroes
Fictional African-American people
Fictional inventors
Characters created by Mike W. Barr
Comics characters introduced in 1993